The Arieș is a right tributary of the river Someș in Romania. It discharges into the Someș in Arieșu de Câmp.

References

Rivers of Romania
Rivers of Maramureș County